Soldiers of the Polish First Army Park otherwise known as Praga Park is a park in Warsaw, Poland. The park is located in the city's Praga district, on the east bank of the Wisła River.

Park was established in 1865-71 and designed by Jan Dobrowolski.
In 1927 a zoological garden (Ogród Zoologiczny) was established on the park grounds, and in 1952 a bear run, still open today.

Also found in the park are a statue of the writer Eliza Orzeszkowa which was erected in 1938, the work of sculptor Henryk Kuna, and a giraffe sculpture dating from 1981.

References

See also

 Polish First Army

Parks in Warsaw